Boris Alexeyevich Smyslovsky, pseudonyms (Hauptmann) von Regenau and (later) Arthur Holmston (3 December 1897 – 5 September 1988), was a Russian-Finnish general, émigré and anti-communist. He commanded the pro-Axis collaborationist First Russian National Army during World War II.

World War I 
He joined the Imperial Russian Army, where he advanced to the rank of captain in the Imperial Guards.

Russian Civil War and the interwar period 
During the Russian Civil War he fought against the Bolsheviks in the White Army and then moved to Poland and later to Germany. He attended the Prussian Military Academy. His view was that foreign intervention and help was needed to free Russia from Bolshevism.

World War II 
The White émigré and Russian nationalist Boris Smyslovksy, commanded the eastern battalion of the Russian All-Military Union based in Warsaw, and in July 1941 formed an Abwehr Training Battalion (Lehrbattalion) for anti-partisan and warfare duties under Wehrmacht Army Group North. By December, he had recruited more than 10,000 Russians into 12 reconnaissance battalions, unified into Sonderdivision R. In March 1942, Smyslovsky formed the Sonderstab R counterintelligence agency in Warsaw, with Colonel Mikhail M. Shapovalov controlling 1,000 agents in detachment in Pskov. 

He soon realized that Nazi ideology was at collision with his views of intelligent use of Russian anti-Bolshevik forces and established feelers to Switzerland in case he would need asylum at the war's end.

1st Russian National Army
Towards the end of the war Germany upgraded its Russian volunteers in the war effort, and the army led by Smyslovsky was eventually elevated to the 1st Russian National Army, i.e. the status of an independent Axis army, on 10 March 1945. By April 1945, Smyslovsky had moved his fighters to Feldkirch where he met Grand Duke Vladimir Cyrillovich, the Romanov claimant to the Russian Imperial Crown. The whittled-down army of 462 men, 30 women, and 2 children then moved into neutral Liechtenstein on 2 May 1945, the Grand Duke, however, decided to stay in the US occupied zone in Austria because neither Liechtenstein nor Switzerland would issue him a visa. The Russians were cared for by the Liechtenstein Red Cross. On 16 August 1945, a Soviet delegation came to Liechtenstein in an attempt to repatriate the Russians. Homesick and subject to cajoling and menacing, about 200 of the group agreed to return. They departed in a train to Vienna and nothing was ever heard of them again. The remainder stayed in Liechtenstein for another year, resisting with support of Liechtenstein further pressure by the Soviet government to participate in the repatriation program. Eventually the government of Argentina offered asylum, and about 100 people left. Smyslovsky was visited by Allen Dulles and other Western military experts, to utilise his expertise regarding the Soviet Union, and handed information over to Reinhard Gehlen's espionage system .

According to Alexander Frick, Prime Minister of Liechtenstein, the Russians were at no point in danger of being extradited, and the local population fully supported the government in providing asylum to the Russians.  The small population of the country (12,141 in 1945) supported the émigrés (4% of the population) at a rate of 30,000 Swiss francs per month for two years, and paid their costs to move to Argentina;  they did not know that these costs were later to be reimbursed by Germany.  Liechtenstein was the only country that routinely refused requests by Soviet authorities for the extradition of Soviet citizens suspected of  treasonous activities and/or war crimes during World War II.   The  Liechtenstein government did not obstruct individuals who agreed voluntarily to return to the Soviet Union. Members of  the Russian National Army who chose to return to the USSR were removed from trains en route and summarily executed by Soviet authorities, in Hungary.

Death

Like most of the rest he went into exile in Argentina. In 1975 he returned to Liechtenstein with his wife Irene. He died in Vaduz on 5 September 1988.

Awards and decorations
Order of Saint Stanislaus (Imperial House of Romanov) 3rd and 4th class with swords and ribbon
Order of Saint Anne 3rd class with swords and ribbon and 4th class for bravery
Eastern Front Medal 
War Merit Cross 2nd class with swords 
Iron Cross 2nd class 
Ostvolk Medal 2nd class in gold and silver with swords
Ostvolk Medal 1st class in gold and silver with swords
Order of the German Eagle 2nd class with swords

Movie
The 1993 French movie Vent d'est,  directed by Robert Enrico, is based on the perambulation of Smyslovsky and his army. He is portrayed by Malcolm McDowell.

See also
Russian Monument
Russian Liberation Movement
Andrey Vlasov
Bronislav Kaminski

Notes

References

External links
Vent d'est (1993) movie

1897 births
1988 deaths
People from Zelenogorsk, Saint Petersburg
People from Viipuri Province (Grand Duchy of Finland)
White movement generals
Major generals of the German Army (Wehrmacht)
History of Liechtenstein
Russian collaborators with Nazi Germany
Russian military personnel of World War I
People of the Russian Civil War
White Russian emigrants to Germany
Military personnel of the Russian Empire